ReMastered: Who Shot the Sheriff? is a 2018 documentary film is centered around the 1976 assassination attempt on Bob Marley. The documentary was released by Netflix on October 12, 2018. It was nominated for an Emmy for Outstanding Arts & Culture Documentary at the 40th News and Documentary Emmy Award.

Premise
As the story is told, we get an insight into the violent political suppression of the roots reggae movement in Jamaica, with the CIA's involvement in the mysterious shooting of Bob Marley.

Cast
 Bob Marley
 Arnold Bertram
 Cindy Breakspeare
 Nancy Burke
 Jimmy Cliff
 Carl Colby
 Tommy Cowan
 Ras Gilly
 Vivien Goldman
 Laurie Gunst
 Diane Jobson
 Wayne Jobson
 Edward Seaga
 Roger Steffens
 Jeff Walker

Release
It was released on October 12, 2018 on Netflix streaming.

References

External links

 
 
 

2018 documentary films
2018 films
Netflix original documentary films
2010s English-language films